The  is an award presented by the  for contributions to linguistics. The prize has been awarded since 1982 and is named after Shinmura Izuru, known for his many contributions to Japanese linguistics and lexicography.

List of recipients 
 1982
 The Uralic Society of Japan: for their contributions in their journal Uralica vol. 5
 Research Group for Historical Japanese Lexicology (Kokugo goishi kenkyūkai): For contributions in their publication Studies in Historical Japanese Lexicology (Kokugo goishi no kenkyū) Nos. 2 and 3.
 1983
 Hōbōgirin Research Institute (Hōbōgirin Kenkyūjo): For their contribution in Hōbōgirin, an encyclopedia of Buddhism.
 1984
 Harumichi Ishizuka: Zushoryō Manuscripts, Nihon Syoki: Research Part (Zushoryōbon Nihon Shoki Kenkyūhen)
 Junichi Endō: Critical Study on Fables of Aesop I, II (Isopo Monogatari no genten teki kenkyū, Sēhen, Zokuhen)
 1985
 Yukihiro Yamaguchi: Comprehensive study of a dialect in Arai, Shizuoka, Japan
 Yoshiki Yamaguchi: On Establishment of Old Japanese Syntax and Morphology (Kodai nihongo bunpō no seiritsu no kenkyū)
 1986
 Akira Minegishi: Linguistic Study of Records of Heian Period (Heian jidai kokiroku no kokugogaku teki kenkyū)
 1987
 Yorio Ōtaka: Marie de France : Oeuvres complètes
 Kazuo Takeuchi: A Turkish-Japanese Dictionary (Torukogo jiten)
 Studies in Japanese of Kamakura era (Kamakura jidaigo kenkyū): Studies in Language of Kamakura Vol. 1-10
 1988
 Konshi Fukuda: Dictionary of Literary Manchu (Manshūgo bungo jiten)
 1989
 Haruo Aoki: For a transliteration and a translation of Nez Perce folklore
 1990
 Dialectological Circle of Japan (Nihon hōgen kenkyūkai): The course of Study of Japanese Dialects: Festschrift for the centenary of a birth of Misao Tōjō. Study part, bibliography part. (Nihon hōgen kenkyū no ayumi: Tōjō Misao sensē sētan 100 shūnen kinen)
 1991
 Kazue Akinaga: Studies on Glossed Texts in Kokin Wakashū (Kikon-wakashū sēten bon no kenkyū)
 Kazuhiko Yoshida: The Hittite Mediopassive Endings in -ri
 1992
 Yoshio Mase: History of Nagano Prefecture, "Dialect" Part (Nagano kenshi hōgenhen)
 1993
 Masayoshi Matsuda, Kanichi Itoi, Kōichirō Hidaka: Changes in Environment of Dialect Use, 1955 and 1985 (Hōgen sēkatsu 30 nen no henyō)
 1994
 Motoki Nakajima: Modern Kantonese Dictionary (Gendai kantongo jiten)
 1995
 Kenji Sakai: A Variorum Edition of Kōyō Gunkan (Kōyō gunkan taisē)
 Tsuguhito Takeuchi: Old Tibetan Contracts from Central Asia
 1996
 Kenjirō Soeda: Issues on History of Japanese Accent (Nihongo akusento shi no sho mondai)
 1997
 (no prize awarded)
 1998
 Akihiko Yonekawa: Japanese-Japanese Sign Language Dictionary (Nihongo-Shuwa Jiten)
 Masato Hachiya: Word Formational Studies of Japanese Reduplicated Words (Kokugo chōfuku go no go kōsēron teki kenkyū)
 Fuminori Sakono: A Philological Study of Japanese Dialect (Bunken hōgen shi kenkyū)
 1999
 Katsuaki Numoto: Historical Studies on Japanese Hanzi Reading: Its Structure and Written Forms (Nihon kanji on no rekishi teki kenkyū: taikē to hyōki wo megutte)
 Kiyoshi Matsuda: Philological Study on Western Learning in Japan (Yōgaku no shoshi teki kenkyū)
 2000
 Yasuko Yamaguchi: Stylistic Study of Konjaku Monogatarishū: Written Narrative (Konjaku monogatarishū no bunshō kenkyū: kakitomerareta "monogatari")
 2001
 (no prize awarded)
 2002
 Toshiaki Muroyama: Meaning and Yoko Society Structuring: View from Lexicons of Words of Tendency in Dialects (Yoko shakai no kōzō to imi: hōgen sēkō goi ni miru)
 Chigusa Kobayashi: Studies of Japanese Expressions in the Middle Ages Used in the Shōmono, Kyōgen, and Christian Writings (Chūsei bunken no hyōgenron teki kenkyū)
 2003
 Shigehiro Katō: A Pragmatic Study of Modification Structure in Japanese (Nihongo shūshoku kōzō no goyōron teki kenkyū)
 2004
 Takashi Kobayashi: Methods of Dialectological Studies in the History of Japanese Language (Hōgengaku teki nihongo shi no hōhō)
 2005
 Onore Watanabe: A Morphological Description of Sliammon, Mainland Comox Salish with a Sketch of Syntax
 Yōko Yumoto: Meaning and Syntax of Complex Verb and Derivative Verb (Fukugō dōshi, hasē dōshi no imi to tōgo)
 2006
 Shingo Yamamoto: A Stylistic Study of Hyōbyaku and Gammon of Heian and Kamakura Eras (Heian, Kamakura jidai ni okeru hyōbyaku, gwanmon no buntai no kenkyū)
 Satoshi Kinsui: A History of Existential Expressions in Japanese (Nihongo sonzai hyōgen no rekishi)
 2007
 (no prize awarded)
 2008
 (no prize awarded)
 2009
 Isamu Sasaki: Studies in the Kan'on of the Heian and Kamakura Eras (Heian-Kamakura-jidai ni okeru Nihon-kan'on no Kenkyū, kenkyūhen, shiryōhen)
 2010
 (no prize awarded)
 2011
 Kazuaki Ueno: Studies in the Early Modern Kyoto dialect Through Heikyoku Notes (Heikyoku fubon ni yoru kinsei kyōto accent no shiteki kenkyū)
 Rika Miyai and Makiko Motoi: Kinzōron: A Text and Commentary (Kinzōron: Honbun to kenkyū)
 2012
 Masato Kobayashi: Texts and Grammar of Malto
2013
(no prize awarded)
2014
Mayumi Kudo
2015
(no prize awarded)
2016
(no prize awarded)
2017
Emiko Hayatsu: Causative Sentences in Modern Japanese

References

External links
 Official site of Shinmura Izuru Foundation (in Japanese)

Language-related awards